List of Washington Senators seasons may refer to:

 List of Minnesota Twins seasons, which includes the seasons of the original Washington Senators (1901–1960) before they moved to Minnesota for the 1961 season
 List of Texas Rangers seasons, which includes the seasons of the expansion Washington Senators (1961–1971) before they moved to Texas for the 1972 season